The 2019–20 Håndboldligaen,  is the 84th season of the Håndboldligaen, Denmark's premier Handball league. The season was stopped on 7th April 2021 due to the COVID-19 pandemic. Remaining regular season as well as play-offs were cancelled. Aalborg Håndbold was declared winner of the 2019-2020 Håndboldligaen.

Team information 

The following 14 clubs compete in the Håndboldligaen during the 2019–20 season:

Personnel and kits
Following is the list of clubs competing in 2019–20 Håndboldligaen, with their manager, kit manufacturer and shirt sponsor.

Regular season

Standings

! There's a new relegation playoff made in November 2014

Schedule and results

No. 1-8 from the regular season divided into two groups with the top two will advance to the semifinals

Top goalscorers

Regular season

Overall season

Number of teams by regions

References

External links
 Danish Handball Federaration 

2019–20 domestic handball leagues
Handboldligaen
Handball competitions in Denmark
2020 in Danish sport